Punk'd is an American hidden camera–practical joke reality television series that first aired on MTV in 2003. It was created by Ashton Kutcher and Jason Goldberg, with Kutcher serving as producer and host. It bears a resemblance to both the classic hidden camera show Candid Camera and to TV's Bloopers & Practical Jokes, which also featured pranks on celebrities. Being "punk'd" referred to being the victim of such a prank. New episodes hosted by King Bach and DeStorm Power aired on BET.

A new reboot of the series hosted by Chance the Rapper premiered on Quibi in 2020 and moved to The Roku Channel upon the platform's demise, premiering the second season in December 2021.

History and format
Originally, Ashton Kutcher and MTV were developing a program called Harassment, a hidden camera show which would feature pranks on regular people. However, a January 2002 prank involving a fake dead body at the Hard Rock Hotel in Las Vegas backfired and the couple who were targets of the prank sued Kutcher, MTV, and the hotel for $10 million. The concept was later retooled to involve celebrities instead. Pranks would be set at a variety of locations, public and private. The show's first prank was set at singer Justin Timberlake's home, where he was led to believe that government agents were seizing his home and valuables because of unpaid income taxes. Time magazine ranked the prank #3 on its list of 32 Epic Moments in Reality-TV History. Another involved Frankie Muniz's special custom-made limited edition Porsche being stolen.

A frequent segment during the first two seasons was a Punk'd cast member pretending to interview celebrities at red carpet events, only to mock them instead. This segment closely copies what originated on The Howard Stern Show in the 1980s, when Stern and his writers began sending interns (most notably Stuttering John Melendez) to ask celebrities embarrassing questions on the red carpet. During the first season then-fifteen-year-old Ryan Pinkston posed as a reporter from a children's television program, and would insult the celebrities. During season two, the producers then chose a foreign interviewer accompanied by her interpreter who would then ask inane questions to the guests. Several actors, like Jill Wagner, Masi Oka, B. J. Novak, Caitlyn Taylor Love, Dax Shepard, and a then-unknown Bill Hader were accomplices in the pranks.

The series finale aired on MTV on May 29, 2007, and culminated in early June with the Punk'd Awards.

Revival
In October 2010, New York Magazine revealed that Punk'd was being revived with Justin Bieber replacing Kutcher as the host; however, it stated that Kutcher would remain as executive producer. After a five-year hiatus, the program was revived with a March 2012 premiere. The first episode of the ninth season, featuring Bieber as a guest host, was filmed in late August 2011. On December 31, 2011, MTV confirmed that the program would be revived in 2012, and that a different celebrity guest host would be featured each episode, the guests included: Tyler, the Creator, Justin Bieber, Bam Margera, Hayden Panettiere, Lucy Hale, Nick Cannon, Dax Shepard, Ashley Tisdale, Demi Lovato, Miley Cyrus, Heather Morris, Kellan Lutz, Daniel Tosh, and Mac Miller. Ashton Kutcher made a returning appearance on an episode where he got to punk again.

The ninth season ended on June 7, 2012.

BET reboot
On May 25, 2013, Katalyst Media stated that a tenth season was in development. At their 2015 upfronts, BET announced that they would be rebooting the program for their network. Although Katalyst had closed by then Goldberg returned as executive producer with a revival of the Katalyst banner without Kutcher. The reboot is tailored for the network's audience and goes behind the scenes of many pranks. The reboot premiered on August 18, 2015.

To promote the program, BET announced the return of BET: Uncut, a block for uncut music videos, on August 11, 2015. In reality, after a revelation and introduction from new hosts, King Bach and DeStorm Power, BET aired highlights from past segments of the program as well as previews for their program.

Quibi reboot
In 2020, it was announced that a new Punk'd reboot would air on the mobile video platform Quibi hosted by Chance the Rapper. After Quibi was shut down in December 2020, on January 8, 2021, Roku bought the rights to Quibi's content library, including Punk'd for seven years. Season 2 premiered on The Roku Channel on December 10, 2021.

Syndication

Punk'd began in off-network syndication in 2008 and in the fall of that year, Trifecta Entertainment & Media put it into barter syndication and aired on affiliates of Fox, MyNetworkTV, The CW, and Independent stations. However, as of fall 2012, the show has left local syndication along with The Hills and Laguna Beach due to lack of ratings.

See also
 Candid Camera
 List of practical joke topics

References

External links
 Official BET website
 Official Roku website
 

2000s American comedy television series
2000s American reality television series
2003 American television series debuts
2007 American television series endings
2010s American comedy television series
2010s American reality television series
2012 American television series debuts
2012 American television series endings
2015 American television series debuts
2015 American television series endings
2020s American comedy television series
2020s American reality television series
2020 American television series debuts
English-language television shows
American hidden camera television series
MTV reality television series
Practical jokes
American television series revived after cancellation
BET original programming
Quibi original programming